A number of Old West gangs left a lasting impression on American history. While rare, the incidents were retold and embellished by dime novel and magazine authors during the late 19th and the early 20th century. The most notable shootouts took place on the American frontier in Arizona, New Mexico, Kansas, Oklahoma, and Texas. Some like the Gunfight at the O.K. Corral were the outcome of long-simmering feuds and rivalries but most were the result of a confrontation between outlaws and law enforcement.

Some of the more notable gangs.

 Alvord-Stiles Gang (1899-1903)
 
 Bummers Gang (1855–1860)
Chacon Gang (c. 1890-1902)
 Bass Gang (1877–1878)
 Tom Bell Gang (1856)
 Burrow Gang (1887–1890)
 Captain Ingram's Partisan Rangers (1864)
 The Cowboys (1877–1881)
 Dalton Gang (1890–1892)
 Daly Gang (1862–1864)
 Dodge City Gang (1879–1880)
 Doolin-Dalton Gang (1892–1895)
 Jack Taylor Gang (c 1884–1887)
 Jessie Evans Gang (1876–1880)
 Flores Daniel Gang (1856–1857)
 Five Joaquins (1850–1853)
 Farrington Brothers (1870–1871)
 Greer Gang (1900-- 1917) The Last Western Outlaw Gang
 High Fives Gang (1895–1897)
 Hole in the Wall Gang (c. 1890-1910)
 The Hounds (1849)
 The Old Ginger Gang (1878-1900)
 The Innocents (1863–1864)
 James-Younger Gang (1866–1882)
 The Ketchum Gang (1896–1899)
 John Kinney Gang (1875–1883)
 The Lee Gang (c. 1883–1885)
 Lincoln County Regulators (1878)
 Mason Henry Gang (1864–1865)
 McCanles Gang (1861)
 McCarty Gang (1892–1893)
 Mes Gang (c. 1870–1876)
 Musgrove Gang (1867–1868)
 Newton Gang (c. 1919-1924)
 Red Jack Gang (c. 1880–1883)
 Reno Gang (1866–1868)
 Rogers Brothers Gang (1890s)
 Reynolds Gang (1863–1864)
 Rufus Buck Gang (1895–1896)
 Selmans Scouts (1878)
 Seven Rivers Warriors (1875–1879)
 Silva's White Caps (c. 1889–1893)
 Smith Gang (1898-1902)
 Soap Gang (1880-1898)
 Stockton Gang (1878–1881)
 Sydney Ducks (1849–1851)
 Bill Whitley Gang (1887–1888)
 Wild Bunch (1892–1895)
 Dos Hermanos Gang (1876–1902)

See also
 List of cowboys and cowgirls
 List of Old West lawmen
 List of Old West gunfighters
 List of Old West gunfights
 List of criminal enterprises, gangs and syndicates
 Red Dead
 Red Dead Redemption 2

References

Lists of American people
Lists of criminals
Lists of gangs